Kyrgyzstan is scheduled to compete in the 2017 Asian Winter Games in Sapporo and Obihiro, Japan from February 19 to 26. The country is scheduled to compete in four sports (four disciplines). The team consists of 33 athletes, a drop of 19 athletes from the previous edition of the games in 2011. The Kyrgyzstani government plans on spending  on the team's participation at the games.

On February 1, 2017 it was announced that ice hockey player Elzar Bolotbekov would be the country's flagbearer during the parade of nations at the opening ceremony.

Competitors
The following table lists the Kyrgyzstani delegation per sport and gender.

Alpine skiing

Kyrgyzstan's alpine skiing team consists of four athletes (two men and two women).

Men
Maxim Gordeev
Evgeniy Timofeev

Women
Olga Paliutkina
Dariha Muratalieva

Biathlon

Kyrgyzstan's biathlon team consists of four athletes. Both Kunduz Abdykadyrova and Tariel Zharkymbaev will also compete in the cross-country skiing competitions.

Men
Tariel Zharkymbaev
Nurbek Doolatov

Women
Kunduz Abdykadyrova
Natalia Levdanskaia

Figure skating

Kyrgyzstan's figure skating team consists of two athletes in the women's singles event.

Ice hockey

Kyrgyzstan has entered a men's hockey team. The team will compete in division two. Kyrgyzstan finished in second place (12th place overall) in division 2 of the competition.

Men's tournament

Kyrgyzstan was represented by the following 23 athletes:

Elzar Bolotbekov (G)
Rinat Mustafaev (G)
Adilet Uulu Zhyrgalbek (G)
Amanbek Uulu Esen (D)
Adis Kachkynbekov (D)
Oleg Kolodii (D)
Vladimir Nichipurenko (D)
Zalkarbek Uulu Salmorbek (D)
Urmat Sheishenaliev (D)
Uran Tursunbekov (D)
Adilet Zhookaev (D)
Kanat Uulu Abylmechin (F)
Duulat Abyshev (F)
Nurzhan Ibraimovv (F)
Atai Ismaiilov (F)
Adilet Uulu Kazybek (F)
Anton Kudashev (F)
Beknazar Paizov (F)
Artem Semiletko (F)
Aibek Shakirov (F)
Daniil Shushenkov (F)
Taalaibek Suiunbaev (F)
Salamat Tynaliev (F)

Legend: G = Goalie, D = Defense, F = Forward 
Group A

11th place match

References

Nations at the 2017 Asian Winter Games
Kyrgyzstan at the Asian Winter Games
2017 in Kyrgyzstani sport